The 2020 Sofia Open was a tennis tournament played on indoor hard courts. It was the 5th edition of the Sofia Open as part of the ATP Tour 250 series of the 2020 ATP Tour. Originally scheduled for 28 September to 4 October at the Arena Armeec in Sofia, Bulgaria, but due to the COVID-19 pandemic it was rescheduled to 8–14 November.

Singles main-draw entrants

Seeds

1 Rankings as of 2 November 2020

Other entrants 
The following players received wildcards into the singles main draw:
  Adrian Andreev
  Dimitar Kuzmanov
  Jonáš Forejtek

The following players received entry from the qualifying draw:
  Taro Daniel
  Aslan Karatsev
  Gilles Simon
  Viktor Troicki

The following players received entry as lucky losers:
  Marc-Andrea Hüsler
  Martin Kližan
  Illya Marchenko

Withdrawals
  Kevin Anderson → replaced by  Jannik Sinner
  Roberto Bautista Agut → replaced by  Adrian Mannarino
  Pablo Carreño Busta → replaced by  Andrej Martin
  Borna Ćorić → replaced by  Marc-Andrea Hüsler
  Fabio Fognini → replaced by  Marin Čilić
  Taylor Fritz → replaced by  Salvatore Caruso
  Karen Khachanov → replaced by  Illya Marchenko
  Filip Krajinović → replaced by  Roberto Carballes Baena
  Dušan Lajović → replaced by  Egor Gerasimov
  Gaël Monfils → replaced by  Martin Kližan
  Kei Nishikori → replaced by  Márton Fucsovics
  Milos Raonic → replaced by  Radu Albot
  Casper Ruud → replaced by  John Millman
  Diego Schwartzman → replaced by  Yūichi Sugita

Doubles main-draw entrants

Seeds 

 1 Rankings are as of 2 November 2020.

Other entrants 
The following pairs received wildcards into the doubles main draw:
  Alexander Donski /  Vasko Mladenov
  Dimitar Kuzmanov /  Viktor Troicki

Champions

Singles 

  Jannik Sinner def.  Vasek Pospisil, 6–4, 3–6, 7–6(7–3)

Doubles 

  Jamie Murray /  Neal Skupski def.  Jürgen Melzer /  Édouard Roger-Vasselin, walkover

References

External links 
Official website
Tournament page at ATPTour.com

Sofia Open
Sofia Open
Sofia Open
Sofia Open
Sofia Open